Berar may refer to:
Vidarbha, the eastern region of Maharashtra Province, India, historically known as Berar
Berar Sultanate (1490–1596), one of the Deccan sultanates
Berar Subah (1596–1724), a Subah of the Mughal Empire
Berar Province (1724–1903), a province of British India under the nominal sovereignty of Hyderabad State
Berar Division (1903–1947), a division of the Central Provinces of British India
Berar (ship), a sailing ship built in 1863

See also
Central Provinces and Berar, a province of British India